Tulloch may refer to:

People with the surname
Alexander Bruce Tulloch (1838–1920), Major-general in the British Army, author
Bert Tulloch, English footballer
Bitsie Tulloch, American actress
Francis Tulloch (born 1940), Jamaican politician
Ian Tulloch (born 1950), New Zealand politician and racing-driver
John Tulloch (1823–1886), Scottish theologian
Lee Tulloch, Australian journalist and author
Maurice Tulloch (born 1969), British/Canadian businessman
Stephen Tulloch, American football player
Jonathan Tulloch, British writer 
William John Tulloch, British bacteriologist

Transport
Tulloch railway station, in the Highland region of Scotland
Tulloch Limited, a rolling stock and locomotive builder formerly at Rhodes, Sydney, Australia

Other uses
Tulloch (horse), New Zealand bred horse who raced in Australia
Tulloch, Perth and Kinross, an area of Perth, Scotland